William Bellamy (born April 7, 1965) is an American actor and stand-up comedian. Bellamy first gained national notoriety on HBO's Russell Simmons' Def Comedy Jam, where he is credited for creating or coining the phrase "booty call", described as a late night call to a potential paramour with the intention of meeting strictly for sex.

Early life and family
Bellamy was born in Newark, New Jersey. Bellamy is a cousin of basketball player Shaquille O'Neal.

He attended Seton Hall Preparatory School in nearby South Orange, New Jersey (now located in West Orange). He majored in economics at Rutgers University.

Career
For many years, Bellamy was a staple on MTV, a VJ and the host of several MTV programs including MTV Jamz and MTV Beach House.  He went on to star in a number of movies, including Fled, Love Jones, The Brothers, How to Be a Player, Getting Played and Any Given Sunday. He also appeared on two episodes of the TV show Kenan and Kel. Additionally, he voiced Skeeter on the Nickelodeon television show Cousin Skeeter.

In 2002, Bellamy had a co-starring role in the Fox Network television show Fastlane alongside Peter Facinelli and Tiffani Thiessen. He also appeared frequently as a "roundtable" guest on the late night E! talk show Chelsea Lately. Bellamy hosted seasons 5 and 6 of NBC's Last Comic Standing reality show (2007 and 2008). In 2014, he had a recurring role as Councilman Powell on the TV Land original series Hot in Cleveland. He voiced Marcus Hill, a playable character in the 2005 updated version of the NARC video game.

In 2016, Bellamy played FBI Agent Sanders, the partner of Dolph Lundgren's character, in Kindergarten Cop 2.

Bellamy hosted Bill Bellamy's Who's Got Jokes? on TV One. He was also an executive producer for it. In 2020, he starred in the Netflix miniseries Self Made.

Filmography

Film

Television

Music Video

Video Games

References

External links

1965 births
Living people
African-American male actors
African-American male comedians
American male comedians
American male film actors
American male television actors
American stand-up comedians
Male actors from Newark, New Jersey
Rutgers University alumni
Seton Hall Preparatory School alumni
VJs (media personalities)
Comedians from New Jersey
21st-century American comedians
21st-century African-American people
20th-century African-American people